Filip Horanský and Sergiy Stakhovsky were the defending champions but chose not to defend their title.

Denys Molchanov and Aleksandr Nedovyesov won the title after defeating Petr Nouza and Andrew Paulson 4–6, 6–4, [10–6] in the final.

Seeds

Draw

References

External links
 Main draw

Slovak Open - Doubles
2022 Doubles